Ramay is a surname mainly in Punjab, Pakistan. They are a subcaste branching from the Arain caste. 

The name Ramay means Archer. They live in large numbers in the Punjab province of Pakistan. Ramay is a gotra of Arain caste in Pakistan.

Notable people
Muhammad Hanif Ramay (1930 – 1 January 2006), former governor and chief minister of Punjab province.

References

Arain
Social groups of Punjab, Pakistan
Punjabi tribes
Pakistani names